This article is about communications systems in Anguilla.

Telephone

Telephones – main lines in use: 6,200 (2002)
country comparison to the world: 212

Telephones – mobile cellular: 1,800 (2002)
country comparison to the world: 211

Telephone system:
Domestic: Modern internal telephone system
International: EAST CARIBBEAN FIBRE SYSTEM ECFS (cable system)
 microwave radio relay to island of Saint Martin (Guadeloupe and Netherlands Antilles)

Mobile phone (GSM)

Mobile phone operators:
FLOW (Anguilla) Ltd. – GSM and UMTS 850 and 1900 MHz,   LTE 700 MHz  with Island-wide coverage 
Digicel (Anguilla) Ltd. – GSM and UMTS 850 to 1900 MHz, LTE 700 MHz 

Mobiles: ? (2007)

Radio

Radio broadcast stations: AM 3, FM 7, shortwave 0 (2007)

Radios: 3,000 (1997)

Television

Television broadcast stations: 1 (1997)

Televisions: 1,000 (1997)

Internet

Internet country code: .ai (Top level domain)

Internet Service Providers (ISPs): 2 (FLOW – , Digicel Anguilla –  )

Internet hosts: 269 (2012) 
country comparison to the world: 192

Internet: users: 12,377 (2018) 
country comparison to the world: 206

See also
Anguilla
  FLOW (Anguilla) Ltd.

References

External links 
 Public Utilities Commission of Anguilla
 Anguilla, SubmarineCableMap.com

Communications in Anguilla
Anguilla
Anguilla